United Airlines flies to 79 domestic destinations and 111 international destinations in 74 countries including US across Asia, Americas, Africa, Europe and Oceania. This is a list of post-merger destinations, after United was issued a single operating certificate with the former Continental Airlines and does not include cities that were only served by United Express.

Destinations

References

Lists of airline destinations
United Airlines
Star Alliance destinations